André Filipe Rebelo Mesquita (born 10 October 1997) is a Portuguese footballer who plays as a forward for Santa Clara.

Club career
On 17 September 2016, Mesquita  made his professional debut with Fafe in a 2016–17 LigaPro match against Penafiel.

References

External links

Stats and profile at LPFP 
National team data 

1997 births
Living people
Footballers from Porto
Portuguese footballers
Association football forwards
Liga Portugal 2 players
Primeira Liga players
Liga II players
Sporting CP footballers
Boavista F.C. players
Padroense F.C. players
FC Porto players
FC Porto B players
AD Fafe players
FC Dunărea Călărași players
C.S. Marítimo players
C.D. Santa Clara players
C.D. Mafra players
Vitória F.C. players
Portugal youth international footballers
Portuguese expatriate footballers
Portuguese expatriate sportspeople in Romania
Expatriate footballers in Romania